Lippia salicifolia is a species of flowering plant in the verbena family, Verbenaceae, that is endemic to Ecuador.  It is threatened by habitat loss.

References

salicifolia
Endemic flora of Ecuador
Vulnerable plants
Taxonomy articles created by Polbot